Daniel Cross (born 30 March 1983) is a former professional Australian rules footballer who played for the  and Melbourne Football Club in the Australian Football League (AFL). A Charles Sutton Medallist with the Western Bulldogs, he finished his 249-game career with 210 games at the Western Bulldogs and 39 with Melbourne. He has served as the development and rehabilitation coach of the Melbourne Football Club since October 2015.

AFL career

Early career (2002–2004)
Cross was recruited by the Western Bulldogs with the 56th overall selection in the 2000 national draft. He made his AFL debut in a 19-point victory against  in round 10, 2002. Despite the Bulldogs winning the match, he managed only two disposals. He played a further three games for 2002. He played his first match for 2003 in round 4 against , but struggled to make a big impact. He was dropped after round 6 to the VFL to play with Weribee. After impressive performances with Werribee, Cross was recalled to the Bulldogs side. His return to the Bulldogs side was good enough for him to keep his place in the side the following week, but after a disappointing performance against Richmond in round 17, he was again dropped. He made the decision to stay with the Western Bulldogs for the 2004 season, despite only managing to play a total of ten games in his first three seasons.

After playing just two games in the first ten weeks of the 2004 season, Cross was able to play the remaining twelve matches of the season and was named the round 19 nominee for the Rising Star after recording 28 disposals against  at the Telstra Dome.

Key midfielder at Western Bulldogs (2005–2010)
The Western Bulldogs made an impressive start to the 2005 campaign under new coach Rodney Eade. He received his first ever Brownlow vote for his round 7 performance against Brisbane, where he recorded 29 possessions in the 23-point win. He finished the season with 563 disposals, and finished with the most handballs in the league with 384. Cross reached his 50-game milestone in round 4 2006, against  where he collected 20 disposals in a 1-point victory over the Cats. His season comprised many high-disposal matches and he finished the season third overall for disposals and second overall for handballs in the league. He suffered a serious injury against  in round 11 2007 and missed the following six games. In his return match against , he collected 30 disposals.

2008 saw Cross play a more integral role in the midfield, with Scott West suffering a long term injury. He played his 100th AFL game in round 15 against Melbourne, where he registered 25 disposals in a 31-point victory. He was one of the three Bulldogs players nominated for the 2008 MVP award, eventually won by Gary Ablett. The Bulldogs made it to the preliminary final, in what was the best on-field season for the team to that point in Cross' career, they lost the preliminary final to eventual runners up, Geelong, by 29 points. His season was rewarded with the Charles Sutton Medal as the club best-and-fairest, finishing 24 points ahead of Brownlow Medallist, Adam Cooney. He also received the inaugural Scott West award for the most courageous player and the Bruce Wilkinson award for the best player as voted by the trainers.

In October 2008, he married long-time girlfriend Samantha Mallia.

Cross played every match of the 2009 season, where he accumulated a total of 581 disposals. He underwent a double ankle reconstruction in the off-season of 2009, but managed to return during the 2010 NAB Cup, where the Bulldogs were the eventual winners. He played every match of the season which saw the Bulldogs reach a third consecutive preliminary final, but ultimately lost to St Kilda by 24-points. He was the runner up in the best-and-fairest, finishing nine votes behind Ryan Griffen. He also played in the 2010 International Rules Series against Ireland.

Final years at Western Bulldogs (2011–2013)
He continued his consistent performances in 2011 where he averaged over 24 possessions per game for the seventh season in a row. He received the Scott West award and was ranked first at the club for tackles (125, averaging 5.7), handballs (323, averaging 14.7) and marks (125, averaging 5.7). He was nominated for the most courageous player at the AFL Players Association awards, which was eventually won by  captain, Jonathan Brown. During 2012, he shifted between the midfield and defence. He won the Scott West award for the second consecutive year.

Cross played the first eight games of 2013 before being dropped from the senior side, where he played for the Bulldogs aligned side, Williamstown, before earning a recall in round 19 against . In the week leading to the final round clash with Melbourne, it was announced the Bulldogs would not renew Cross' contract, ending his 11-year playing career with the club, in addition, it was the first time in a decade he did not finish inside the top-10 for the best-and-fairest.

Move to Melbourne (2014–2015)
Brought into the club due to his 'reputation for elite preparation and leadership to help out the younger players', he was named in the leadership group alongside Lynden Dunn and Chris Dawes in April 2014, replacing the injured Jack Trengove and retired Mitch Clark. He played the first thirteen matches of 2014 before succumbing to a broken leg during the round 14 match against , he played the remainder of the match, but was forced to miss the next five matches through injury. He was offered a contract extension for 2015 in July due to his leadership experience. He returned to the side in round 20 against  and played the remaining four matches for the season. He won the Dick Taylor trophy for finishing fifth in the best-and-fairest behind Nathan Jones, Dom Tyson, Bernie Vince and Lynden Dunn, he was also rewarded with the James McDonald award for best team man.

Cross was maintained in the leadership group for 2015 and played every match for the season, mainly across half-back. He recorded an equal career-high 39 disposals against  in round 22, however, three days later, it was announced Melbourne would not offer Cross a contract extension and he subsequently announced his retirement effective after the round 23 match against . He was awarded the Ron Barassi Jnr leadership award for 2015 alongside Jack Trengove. In October, he accepted an off-field role to stay at Melbourne as development and rehabilitation coach from 2016 onward. He also acts as the team's runner on game day since 2016.

Albury FC (2016 - 2021)
Cross returned to play with his original club, Albury in the Ovens & Murray Football League in 2016 in a part time roles as a player, when time permitted him with his work commitments at Melbourne FC. He represented the O&MFL in 2016 against the Hampden Football League and won the best on ground award - the Norm Minns Medal. He then followed this up with a 2016 O&MFL premiership, plus the best on ground award in the grand final - the Did Simpson Medal. Cross then played in Albury's losing 2017 grand final, then played in another O&MFL premiership in 2018.

Victoria Harbour incident
On 4 October 2007, Cross and teammate Tom Williams leaped into the water of Victoria Harbour in Hong Kong to rescue a schoolgirl attempting to commit suicide. Despite the girl not wanting to be saved, they hauled her to safety after hearing bystanders screaming for help. When they emerged from the harbour they both had minor bruises and cuts. Both were reported to be in good spirits after the incident. Following the incident, Cross and Williams were awarded certificates of commendation by Hong Kong's Director of Marine.

Statistics

|- style="background-color: #EAEAEA"
! scope="row" style="text-align:center" | 2002
|style="text-align:center;"|
| 38 || 4 || 1 || 0 || 5 || 7 || 12 || 4 || 3 || 0.3 || 0.0 || 1.3 || 1.8 || 3.0 || 1.0 || 0.8
|- 
! scope="row" style="text-align:center" | 2003
|style="text-align:center;"|
| 38 || 6 || 0 || 1 || 19 || 36 || 55 || 19 || 9 || 0.0 || 0.2 || 3.2 || 6.0 || 9.2 || 3.2 || 1.5
|- style="background:#eaeaea;"
! scope="row" style="text-align:center" | 2004
|style="text-align:center;"|
| 38 || 14 || 1 || 0 || 55 || 131 || 186 || 43 || 39 || 0.1 || 0.0 || 3.9 || 9.4 || 13.3 || 3.1 || 2.8
|- 
! scope="row" style="text-align:center" | 2005
|style="text-align:center;"|
| 4 || 22 || 2 || 5 || 179 || 384 || 563 || 127 || 94 || 0.1 || 0.2 || 8.1 || 17.5 || 25.6 || 5.8 || 4.3
|- style="background:#eaeaea;"
! scope="row" style="text-align:center" | 2006
|style="text-align:center;"|
| 4 || 24 || 9 || 6 || 262 || 363 || 625 || 146 || 108 || 0.4 || 0.3 || 10.9 || 15.1 || 26.0 || 6.1 || 4.5
|- 
! scope="row" style="text-align:center" | 2007
|style="text-align:center;"|
| 4 || 15 || 1 || 2 || 126 || 241 || 367 || 89 || 59 || 0.1 || 0.1 || 8.4 || 16.1 || 24.5 || 5.9 || 3.9
|- style="background:#eaeaea;"
! scope="row" style="text-align:center" | 2008
|style="text-align:center;"|
| 4 || 25 || 5 || 2 || 241 || 422 || 663 || 138 || 117 || 0.2 || 0.1 || 9.6 || 16.9 || 26.5 || 5.5 || 4.7
|- 
! scope="row" style="text-align:center" | 2009
|style="text-align:center;"|
| 4 || 23 || 5 || 2 || 162 || 419 || 581 || 128 || 100 || 0.2 || 0.1 || 7.0 || 18.2 || 25.3 || 5.6 || 4.3
|- style="background:#eaeaea;"
! scope="row" style="text-align:center" | 2010
|style="text-align:center;"|
| 4 || 25 || 2 || 4 || 238 || 423 || 661 || 139 || 136 || 0.1 || 0.2 || 9.5 || 16.9 || 26.4 || 5.6 || 5.4
|- 
! scope="row" style="text-align:center" | 2011
|style="text-align:center;"|
| 4 || 22 || 1 || 2 || 207 || 323 || 530 || 125 || 125 || 0.0 || 0.1 || 9.4 || 14.7 || 24.1 || 5.7 || 5.7
|- style="background:#eaeaea;"
! scope="row" style="text-align:center" | 2012
|style="text-align:center;"|
| 4 || 17 || 2 || 1 || 163 || 242 || 405 || 88 || 69 || 0.1 || 0.1 || 9.6 || 14.2 || 23.8 || 5.2 || 4.1
|- 
! scope="row" style="text-align:center" | 2013
|style="text-align:center;"|
| 4 || 13 || 4 || 2 || 117 || 177 || 294 || 71 || 57 || 0.3 || 0.2 || 9.0 || 13.6 || 22.6 || 5.5 || 4.4
|- style="background:#eaeaea;"
! scope="row" style="text-align:center" | 2014
|style="text-align:center;"|
| 18 || 17 || 1 || 3 || 123 || 244 || 367 || 71 || 90 || 0.1 || 0.2 || 7.2 || 14.4 || 21.6 || 4.2 || 5.3
|- 
! scope="row" style="text-align:center" | 2015
|style="text-align:center;"|
| 18 || 22 || 0 || 1 || 216 || 275 || 491 || 116 || 76 || 0.0 || 0.0 || 9.8 || 12.5 || 22.3 || 5.3 || 3.5
|- class="sortbottom"
! colspan=3| Career
! 249
! 34
! 31
! 2113
! 3687
! 5800
! 1304
! 1082
! 0.1
! 0.1
! 8.5
! 14.8
! 23.3
! 5.2
! 4.4
|}

References

External links

Daniel Cross' profile from DemonWiki

Australian rules footballers from New South Wales
Western Bulldogs players
Melbourne Football Club players
Murray Bushrangers players
Williamstown Football Club players
Albury Football Club players
Charles Sutton Medal winners
1983 births
Living people
Australia international rules football team players